Lonesome Pine Trails is a ski resort located in Fort Kent, Maine.

External links
Lonesome Pine Trails official website

Ski areas and resorts in Maine
Tourist attractions in Aroostook County, Maine